The  Cave of Altamira and Paleolithic Cave Art of Northern Spain is a grouping of 18 caves of northern Spain, which together represent the apogee of Upper Paleolithic cave art in Europe between 35,000 and 11,000 years ago (Aurignacian, Gravettian, Solutrean, Magdalenian, Azilian). In 2008, they were collectively designated a World Heritage Site by UNESCO.

Chief among these caves is Altamira, located within the town of Santillana del Mar in Cantabria. It remains one of the most important painting cycles of prehistory, originating in the Magdalenian and Solutrean periods of the Upper Paleolithic. This cave's artistic style represents the Franco-cantabrian school, characterized by the realism of its figural representation. Altamira Cave was declared a World Heritage Site in 1985. In 2008, the World Heritage Site was expanded to include 17 additional caves located in three autonomous communities of northern Spain: Asturias, Cantabria and the Basque Country.

List of caves

See also

National Museum and Research Center of Altamira
Caves in Cantabria
Franco-Cantabrian region
Art of the Upper Paleolithic
List of Stone Age art

References 

Cave of Altamira and Paleolithic Cave Art of Northern Spain (unesco.org)

 
2008 establishments in Spain
Art of the Upper Paleolithic
Paleolithic Europe
Rock art in Spain
Limestone caves
Show caves in Spain
Green Spain
Prehistoric sites in Spain
World Heritage Sites in Spain
Landforms of the Basque Country (autonomous community)
Landforms of Asturias
Tourist attractions in Asturias
Protected areas of Asturias
Tourist attractions in the Basque Country (autonomous community)
Altamira and